Rosellinia arcuata is a plant pathogen infecting tea.

References

External links 
 Index Fungorum
 USDA ARS Fungal Database

Fungal plant pathogens and diseases
Tea diseases
Xylariales
Fungi described in 1916
Taxa named by Thomas Petch